The 2014 Piala Malaysia group stage featured 16 teams. The teams were drawn into fourth groups of four, and played each other home-and-away in a round-robin format. The top two teams in each group advanced to the 2014 Piala Malaysia quarter finals.

Groups
The matchdays were 13–23 August, and 26 August–3 September 2014.

Group A

Group B

Group C

Group D

References

External links
2014 Piala Malaysia, SPMB

2014 in Malaysian football
Malaysia Cup seasons